Jacques Grello  (1915–1978) was a French singer and film actor.

Selected filmography 
 1943 : Madame et le mort by Louis Daquin as L'employé aux Objets Trouvés
 1949 : My Aunt from Honfleur by René Jayet  
 1951 : La Vie chantée by Noël-Noël  
 1952 : Women Are Angels  by Marcel Aboulker as Léon Clotier
 1953 : Women of Paris by Jean Boyer as Le commentateur du ballet 
 1957 : Pot-Bouille by Julien Duvivier as Auguste Vabre
 1957: Lovers of Paris, by Julien Duvivier as Théophile Vabre
 1959: The Bureaucrats by Henri Diamant-Berger as Chavarax
 1963 : La Foire aux cancres by Louis Daquin as the antiquarèy
 1972 : Le Viager by Pierre Tchernia as the centenarian (uncredited)

 Theatre 
1951: Edmée by Pierre-Aristide Bréal, directed by Georges Vitaly, Théâtre de la Huchette
1953: Les Hussards by Pierre-Aristide Bréal, directed by Jacques Fabbri, Théâtre des Noctambules
1954: Les Hussards by Pierre-Aristide Bréal, directed by Jacques Fabbri, Théâtre des Célestins
1957: La terre est basse by Alfred Adam, directed by Georges Vitaly, Théâtre La Bruyère 
1958: Édition de midi by Mihail Sebastian, directed by René Dupuy, Théâtre Gramont
1961: Moulin à poivre by Robert Rocca and Jacques Grello, directed by Jacques Mauclair, Les Trois Baudets  
1968: La Courte Paille hy Jean Meyer, directed by the author
1972: Lidoire by Georges Courteline, directed by Jean Meyer, Maison des Jeunes Cachan

 References 

 Bibliography 
 Goble, Alan. The Complete Index to Literary Sources in Film''. Walter de Gruyter, 1999.

External links 

 Jacques Grello (lunettes), Robert Rocca (cheveux en brosse) et Pierre Tchernia (INA)

French male film actors
20th-century French male actors
French chansonniers
People from Saint-Ouen-sur-Seine
1915 births
1978 deaths
Burials at Père Lachaise Cemetery
20th-century French male singers
French male singer-songwriters